Heidi Northcott (born November 2, 1992 in Rocky Mountain House, Alberta) is a Canadian baseball player. She is a member of the Canada women's national baseball team which won a silver medal at the 2015 Pan American Games.

Playing career

Baseball
At the 2012 Women’s World Cup, Northcott earned a win against Cuba, making a relief appearance. In Canada’s opening game of the 2014 Women's Baseball World Cup, Northcott combined with pitcher Cindy Saavedra on a no-hitter against the Netherlands.

Awards and honours
 Top Pitcher, 2004 Canadian Pee Wee Nationals

Personal
Her father Harold Northcott was a pitcher for the Canadian national men’s baseball team from 1982 to 1987. He would also serve as the pitching coach from 1992 to 2001.

References

1992 births
Canadian female baseball players
Baseball people from Alberta
Living people
Baseball players at the 2015 Pan American Games
Pan American Games silver medalists for Canada
Pan American Games medalists in baseball
Medalists at the 2015 Pan American Games